The rivalry between the Delaware Fightin' Blue Hens and the West Chester Golden Rams was a match-up between two similarly sized schools located less than  apart. Presently, West Chester competes in the Pennsylvania State Athletic Conference as a member of Division II, while Delaware competes in the Colonial Athletic Association as a member of Division I FCS. These classifications allow for competition between the schools, but give inherent advantages to Delaware.  Prior to 1980, Delaware competed in Division II, placing them on the same level as West Chester. , there are no future meetings scheduled in this series.

Game results

A game was scheduled for September 15, 2001 that was cancelled following the September 11 attacks.

See also  
 List of NCAA college football rivalry games

References

College football rivalries in the United States
Delaware Fightin' Blue Hens football
West Chester Golden Rams football
Dissolved sports rivalries